Gold Souq is a rapid transit station on the Green Line of the Dubai Metro in Dubai, UAE. Until May 2020, it was named as Palm Deira.

History
Opened along with the initial stretch of the Green Line from Etisalat to Dubai Healthcare City, trains began calling at Palm Deira station on 9 September 2011. Controversy has arisen over the existence of a ban on carrying fish on the Metro and Palm Deira station's location right near the city's largest fish market. The station was renamed to its current name in May 2020.

Location
Gold Souq metro station is located in the northern section of Deira in the historic centre of Dubai.  It is named after nearby Dubai Gold Souk. Nearby attractions include the Dubai fish market, Hyatt Regency and Golf Park. Also close to this metro station is the eponymous Gold Souq Bus Station. The artificial Deira Islands are located nearby.

Station layout
Like other central stations on the Dubai Metro, Gold Souq is located below ground level. It lies underneath Al Khaleej Road before the tracks make a sharp turn to the southeast on their way to Baniyas Square. There are two side platforms with two tracks, a similar setup to most Metro stations.

Platform layout
Platform numbers are not assigned.

References

Railway stations in the United Arab Emirates opened in 2011
Dubai Metro stations